Tickling Leo is a 2009 independent drama film about three generations of a Jewish family whose silence about their past has kept them apart. The film was directed by Jeremy Davidson, and stars Lawrence Pressman, Daniel Sauli, Annie Parisse, Eli Wallach, Ronald Guttman and Victoria Clark.

Plot
When Zak and his girlfriend Delphina visit his estranged father in the Catskills, they find him suffering from dementia and inadvertently uncover a dark family secret from World War II: an impossible sacrifice Zak's grandfather (Eli Wallach) made to join Rudolph Kasztner's controversial freedom train out of Hungary.

Cast
Lawrence Pressman as Warren Pikler
Daniel Sauli as Zak Pikler
Annie Parisse as Delphina Adams
Sarah Wikenczy as Yuth Mother
Sebastian Wikenczy Thomsen as Child
Jonathan Valackas as Reuvan Ben Amir
Ed Setraklan as Oscar Szoras
Gabor Szucs as Oscar's Grandson
Orsoja Simon as Woman in Bar
Alexander Grech III as Bartender
Jack as Yorrie
Grey Rabbit Puett as Young Warren
Ronald Guttman as Robert Pikler
Victoria Clark as Madeline Pikler
Lara Apponyi as Rivka Pikler
Bern Cohen as Yosef Gottlieb

Release
Tickling Leo screened at the Stony Brook Film Festival on July 25, 2009 and then opened in Manhattan, Queens and on Long Island Theaters on September 4, 2009 with a simultaneous DVD release. The film continued on to play to audiences in NorthEast, Florida and California.

Critical reception
On review aggregator website Rotten Tomatoes the film has a score of 33% based on reviews from 15 critics, with an average rating of 4.5/10.

Awards
2009 Jury Award for Best Feature- 2009 Stony Brook Film Festival

References

External links

2009 drama films
2009 films
American drama films
2000s English-language films
2000s American films